Edmund Burke (1729–1797) was an Irish statesman, political theorist, and philosopher.

Edmund Burke may also refer to:
 Edmond de Burgh (or de Burke) (1298–1338), Irish knight
 Edmund Bourke (1761–1821), Danish statesman
 Edmund Burke (congressman) (1809–1882), U.S. Representative for New Hampshire
 Edmund Burke (architect) (1850–1919), Canadian architect
 Edmund Burke III (born 1940), U.S. historian
 Edmund Burke Fairfield (1821–1904), American minister, educator and politician
 Edmund Burke Foundation, Dutch think tank named after above-mentioned Irish politician and philosopher
 E. Michael Burke (1916–1987), U.S. intelligence officer and business executive
 Sir Edmund Burke, 2nd Baronet (died c. 1686) of the Burke baronets
 Edmund Burke (Thomas), a 1922 public artwork by British artist James Havard Thomas
 Eddie Burke (1905–1993), Canadian ice hockey player

See also
 Clan Burke
 Edward Burke (disambiguation)
 Edmund (disambiguation)
 Burke (disambiguation)